The 1950 United States Senate election in Ohio took place on November 7, 1950. Incumbent Senator Robert A. Taft was elected to a third term in office, easily defeating Democratic State Auditor Joseph T. Ferguson.

Background
Senator Taft unsuccessfully sought the Republican presidential nomination in 1940 and 1948 and was a national leader of the party's conservative wing.

Democratic primary

Candidates
Henry M. Busch
Michael DiSalle, Mayor of Toledo
Joseph T. Ferguson, Ohio Auditor
John Martin
Walter A. Kelley
Edward Welsh
William L. White

Results

General election

See also 
 1950 United States Senate elections

References

1950
Ohio
United States Senate